Nando Pajarola (27 February 1935 – 21 February 2005) was a Swiss alpine skier. He competed in two events at the 1960 Winter Olympics.

References

1935 births
2005 deaths
Swiss male alpine skiers
Olympic alpine skiers of Switzerland
Alpine skiers at the 1960 Winter Olympics
20th-century Swiss people